The Melbourne Cup is a Thoroughbred horse race held in Melbourne, Australia. It is a 3200-metre race for three-year-olds and older, conducted by the Victoria Racing Club on the Flemington Racecourse in Melbourne, Victoria as part of the Melbourne Spring Racing Carnival. It is the richest "two-mile" handicap in the world and one of the richest turf races. The event starts at 3:00 pm on the first Tuesday of November and is known locally as "the race that stops the nation".

The Melbourne Cup has a long tradition, with the first race held in 1861. The present record holder is the 1990 winner Kingston Rule with a time of 3:16.3.

Qualifying and race conditions

The race is a quality handicap for horses three years old and older, run over a distance of 3200 metres, on the first Tuesday in November at Flemington Racecourse. The minimum handicap weight is 50kg. There is no maximum weight, but the top allocated weight must not be less than 57kg. The weight allocated to each horse is declared by the VRC Handicapper in early September.

The Melbourne Cup race is a handicap contest in which the weight of the jockey and riding gear is adjusted with ballast to a nominated figure. Older horses carry more weight than younger ones and weights are adjusted further according to the horse's previous results.

Weights were theoretically calculated to give each horse an equal winning chance in the past, but in recent years the rules were adjusted to a "quality handicap" formula where superior horses are given less severe weight penalties than under pure handicap rules.

Weight penalties
After the declaration of weights for the Melbourne Cup, the winner of any handicap flat race of the advertised value of A$55,000 or over to the winner, or an internationally recognised Listed, Group, or Graded handicap flat race, shall carry such additional weight (if any), for each win, as the VRC Handicapper shall determine.

Fees
Entries for the Melbourne Cup usually close during the first week of August. The initial entry fee is $600 per horse. Around 300 to 400 horses are nominated each year, but the final field is limited to 24 starters. Following the allocation of weights, the owner of each horse must on the four occasions before the race in November declare the horse as an acceptor and pay a fee. First acceptance is $960, second acceptance is $1,450 and third acceptance is $2,420. The final acceptance fee, on the Saturday prior to the race, is $45,375. Should a horse be balloted out of the final field, the final declaration fee is refunded.

Balloting conditions
The race directors may exclude any horse from the race or exempt any horse from the ballot on the race, but in order to reduce the field to the safety limit of 24, horses are balloted out based on a number of factors which include prize money earned in the previous two years, wins or placings in certain lead-up races and allocated handicap weight

The winners of the following races are exempt from any ballot:
Lexus Stakes (formerly Saab Quality and registered as The Hotham Handicap)
LKS Mackinnon Stakes (until 2015)
Cox Plate
Caulfield Cup
The Bart Cummings (from 2015)
Andrew Ramsden Stakes (from 2019)
Doncaster Cup (UK)
Irish St. Leger (IRE)
Tenno Sho (Spring) (JPN)
Sankei Sho All Comers (JPN)
Arlington Million (USA)
San Juan Capistrano Handicap (USA)
Australian Stayers Challenge

The limitation of 24 starters is stated explicitly to be for safety reasons. However, in the past far larger numbers were allowed - the largest field ever raced was 39 runners in 1890.

Quarantine
International horses (except from New Zealand) entering Australia must undergo quarantine in an approved premises in their own country for a minimum period of 14 days before travelling to Australia. As at 3 November 2020, international people must undergo quarantine in an approved premises at their port of entry for a minimum period of 14 days after travelling to Australia. Both premises must meet the Australian Government Standards. The Werribee International Horse Centre at Werribee Racecourse is the Victorian quarantine station for international horses competing in the Melbourne Spring Racing Carnival. The facility has stabling for up to 24 horses in five separate stable complexes and is located 32 km from the Melbourne CBD.

Prize money and trophies

Prize money 
The total prize money for the 2019 race is A$8,000,000, plus trophies valued at $250,000. The first 12 past the post receive prize money, with the winner being paid $4.4 million, second $1.1 million, third $550,000, fourth $350,000, fifth $230,000, with sixth through to twelfth place earning $160,000. Prize money is distributed to the connections of each horse in the ratio of 85 percent to the owner, 10 percent to the trainer and 5 percent to the jockey.

The 1985 Melbourne Cup, won by "What a Nuisance", was the first race run in Australia with prize money of $1 million.

The Cup currently has a $500,000 bonus for the owner of the winner if it has also won the group one Irish St. Leger run the previous September.

Trophies 

The winner of the first Melbourne Cup in 1861 received a gold watch. The first Melbourne Cup trophy was awarded in 1865 and was an elaborate silver bowl on a stand that had been manufactured in England. This is currently owned by Australian wine personality Wolf Blass and is on display at the Wolf Blass Gallery & Museum/Adelaide Hills Wine Bar in Hahndorf, South Australia. The first existing and un-altered Melbourne Cup is from 1866, presented to the owners of The Barb; as of 2013, it is in the National Museum of Australia. The silver trophy presented in 1867, now also in the National Museum of Australia, was also made in England but jewellers in Victoria complained to the Victorian Racing Club that the trophy should have been made locally. They believed the work of Melburnian, William Edwards, to be superior in both design and workmanship to the English made trophy. No trophy was awarded to the Melbourne Cup winner for the next eight years.

In 1876 Edward Fischer, an immigrant from Austria produced the first Australian-made trophy. It was an Etruscan shape with two handles. One side depicted a horse race with the grandstand and hill of Flemington in the background. The opposite side had the words "Melbourne Cup, 1876" and the name of the winning horse. From 1899 the trophy was in the form of silver galloping horse embossed on a  plaque, although it was said to look like a greyhound by some people.

The last Melbourne Cup trophy manufactured in England was made for the 1914 event. It was a chalice centred on a long base which had a horse at each end. The trophy awarded in 1916, the first gold trophy, was a three-legged, three-armed rose bowl. The three-handled loving cup design was first awarded in 1919. In that year the Victorian Racing Club had commissioned James Steeth to design a trophy that would be in keeping with the prestige of the race, little realising that it would become the iconic Melbourne Cup still presented today. In the Second World War years (1942, 1943 and 1944) the winning owner received war bonds valued at 200 pounds.

A new trophy is struck each year and becomes the property of the winning owner. In the event of a dead heat, a second cup is on hand. The present trophy is hand spun from 1.65 kg of 18-carat gold. The winning trainer and jockey also receive a miniature replica of the cup (since 1973) and the strapper is awarded the Tommy Woodcock Trophy, named after the strapper of Phar Lap.

Melbourne Cup Tour 
In 2003 an annual tour of the Melbourne Cup trophy was initiated to provide communities across Australia and New Zealand with an opportunity to view the Cup trophy and highlight the contribution the Melbourne Cup has made to Australia's social, sporting and racing culture. Each year, communities in Australia and New Zealand apply for the cup to tour their community and the tour also takes in cities around the world as part of the Victoria Racing Club's strategy to promote the Melbourne Cup and the Melbourne Cup Carnival internationally.

The Tour has visited schools and aged-care and hospital facilities, and participated in community events and celebrations including race days across Australia and New Zealand.

History

Early years 
Frederick Standish, member of the Victorian Turf Club and steward on the day of the first Cup, was credited with forming the idea to hold a horse race and calling it the "Melbourne Cup".

Seventeen horses contested the first Melbourne Cup on Thursday 7 November 1861, racing for the modest prize of 710 gold sovereigns (£710) cash and a hand-beaten gold watch, winner takes all. The prize was not, as some have suggested, the largest purse up to that time. A large crowd of 4,000 men and women watched the race, although it has been suggested this was less than expected because of news reaching Melbourne of the death of explorers Burke and Wills five days earlier on 2 November. Nevertheless, the attendance was the largest at Flemington on any day for the past two years, with the exception of the recently run Two Thousand Guinea Stakes.

The winner of this first Melbourne Cup race was a 16.3 hand bay stallion by the name of archer in a time of 3.52.00, ridden by John Cutts, trained by Etienne de Mestre, and leased (and consequently raced in his own name) by de Mestre. As a lessee de Mestre "owned" and was fully responsible for Archer during the lease. Archer was leased from the "Exeter Farm" of Jembaicumbene near Braidwood, New South Wales. His owners were Thomas John "Tom" Roberts (a good school-friend of de Mestre's), Rowland H. Hassall (Roberts' brother-in-law), and Edmund Molyneux Royds and William Edward Royds (Roberts' nephews).

The inaugural Melbourne Cup of 1861 was an eventful affair when one horse bolted before the start, and three of the seventeen starters fell during the race, two of which died. Archer, a Sydney "outsider" who drew scant favour in the betting, spread-eagled the field and defeated the favourite, and Victorian champion, Mormon by six lengths. Dismissed by the bookies, Archer took a lot of money away from Melbourne, 'refuelling interstate rivalry' and adding to the excitement of the Cup. The next day, Archer was raced in and won another 2-mile long-distance race, the Melbourne Town Plate.

It has become legend that Archer walked over 800 km (over 500 miles) to Flemington from de Mestre's stable at "Terara" near Nowra, New South Wales. However, newspaper archives of the day reveal that he had travelled south from Sydney to Melbourne on the steamboat City of Melbourne, together with de Mestre, and two of de Mestre's other horses Exeter and Inheritor. Before being winched aboard the steamboat for the trip to Melbourne, the horses had arrived in Sydney in September 1861.

Archer travelled to Melbourne by steamboat again the following year (1862) to run in the second Melbourne Cup. This time he won 810 gold sovereigns (£810) cash and a gold watch before a crowd of 7,000, nearly twice the size of the previous years large crowd in a time of 3.47.00, taking to two the number of Melbourne Cup wins by this horse. Archer had already won the 1862 AJC Queen Elizabeth Stakes in Randwick, Sydney, and returned to win his second Melbourne Cup carrying 10 stone 2 pounds. He defeated a field of twenty starters by eight lengths, a record that has never been beaten, and that was not matched for over 100 years. Mormon again running second. Winning the Melbourne Cup twice was a feat not repeated until more than seventy years later when Peter Pan won the race in 1932 and 1934, and winning the Melbourne Cup two years in a row was a feat not repeated until more than 30 years later when Rain Lover won in 1968 and 1969.

Archer travelled to Melbourne by steamboat yet again the next year (1863). Despite his weight of 11 stone 4 pounds, Archer would have contested the third cup in 1863, but due to a Victorian public holiday trainer Etienne de Mestre's telegraphed acceptance form arrived late, and Archer was scratched on a technicality. In protest of this decision and in a show of solidarity, many of de Mestre's owners boycotted the third race and scratched their horses in sympathy. As a result, the Melbourne Cup of that year ran with only 7 starters, the smallest number in the history of the Cup.

In 1865, Adam Lindsay Gordon wrote a verse in which the Melbourne Cup winner was called Tim Whiffler. Two years later in 1867 two horses with the name Tim Whiffler ran in the Melbourne Cup. (The year before in 1866 two horses with the same name, Falcon, also ran in the Melbourne Cup.) To distinguish between the two Tim Whifflers they were called "Sydney" Tim Whiffler and "Melbourne" Tim Whiffler. "Sydney" Tim Whiffler actually won the Cup. He was trained by Etienne de Mestre, and like Archer before him raced in de Mestre's name but was leased from the "Exeter Farm".

As early as 1865, Cup day was a half-holiday in Melbourne for public servants and bank officials. Various businesses also closed at lunchtime.

It took some years before the purpose of the declared holiday was acknowledged in the Victoria Government Gazette. The Gazette of 31 October 1873 announced that the following Thursday (Cup Day) be observed as a bank and civil (public) service holiday.

The Melbourne Cup was first run on a Tuesday in 1875, the first Tuesday in that month.

On 7 November 1876, the three-year-old filly, Briseis, owned and trained by James Wilson Snr., won in a time of 3.36.25. Briseis then went on to create a record that is never likely to be equalled, winning the VRC Derby, the Melbourne Cup and the VRC Oaks in the space of six days. She was ridden in the Melbourne Cup by the tiny featherweight figure of jockey Peter St. Albans. In 1876 at the recorded age thirteen (he was actually twelve, being 8 days short of his thirteenth birthday), Peter St. Albans is also the youngest person ever to win a Melbourne Cup. Before 75,000 at Flemington Briseis, with St Albans in the saddle, comfortably won by 1 length in the biggest field of all time. "At 4 o'clock the starter released the 33 runners and they swept down the long Flemington straight in a thundering rush. Briseis, ridden by what one writer termed a mere child, (in the Cup) captured a rare double, the Victoria Race Club Derby and the Melbourne Cup. Shouts and hurrahs were heard, hats were thrown in the air and one excited individual fell on his back in the attempt to do a somersault. The boy who rode the winner was carried around the pack and is the hero of the day," reported the "Australasian Sketcher" in 1876. Both Peter St. Albans and Briseis have now become racing legends, and Briseis is regarded as one of the greatest mares foaled in Australia.

Briseis wasn't the only sensation surrounding the 1876 Melbourne Cup. Two months before the event, on Saturday 9 September, the City of Melbourne sailed for Melbourne from Sydney with a cargo including 13 racehorses, many of whom were considered serious contenders for the Melbourne Cup. The following day the ship ran into a savage storm and was hit by several rogue waves, with Nemesis (the winner of the 1876 AJC Metropolitan Handicap in Randwick, Sydney and favourite for the Cup, owned by John Moffat) and Robin Hood (another favourite, owned by Etienne de Mestre) being among the 11 horses that were killed. Betting on the big race was paralysed. To the dismay and anger of the public, bookmakers, showing no feeling, presented a purse (loaded with coins) to the captain as token of their appreciation for his part in saving them many thousands of pounds in bets already laid on the favourites who had perished. Perhaps they should have kept their money, however. The outsider Briseis comfortably won by 1 length in the biggest field of all time and is an extremely good time, so it is unlikely that the horses who perished could have beaten her.

1877 is also the year that the trainer Etienne de Mestre won his fourth Melbourne Cup with Chester owned by Hon. James White. In 1878, as in previous years, De Mestre fielded more than one horse. He entered the favourite Firebell (owned by W.S. Cox) who finished last, Chester (owned by Hon. James White) the previous year's winner who fell, and Calamia (owned by de Mestre) who, though less fancied, won easily by two lengths. First prize was £1,790, the crowd was 80,000 and there were 30 starters. De Mestre's 1878 win with Calamia brought to 5 the number of Melbourne Cups he had won. This record was not to be matched for nearly 100 years when the trainer Bart Cummings won his fifth Melbourne Cup in 1975. Bart Cummings, regarded as the best Australian horse trainer of all time, went on to win 12 Melbourne Cups to 2008.

In 1883, the hardy New Zealand bred, Martini-Henry won the VRC Derby, the Melbourne Cup and on the following Monday retained his undefeated record by winning Mares' Produce Stakes.

Phar Lap, the most famous horse in the world of his day, won the 1930 Melbourne Cup at 11/8 odds on, the shortest-priced favourite in the history of the race. He had to be hidden away at Geelong before the race after an attempt was made to shoot him and only emerged an hour before the race time of the Cup. Phar Lap also competed in 1929 and 1931, but came 3rd and 8th respectively, despite heavy favouritism in both years.

There are a few legends of the first Aboriginal jockey to ride in a Melbourne Cup. It was believed to be John Cutts who won the first and second cups in 1861 and 1862 riding archer. He was reputedly an Aboriginal stockman born in the area where Archer was trained but was actually John 'Cutts' Dillon, the son of a Sydney clerk, a jockey who rode for many trainers in his long career, and who was one of the best known, best-liked and most respected jockeys in New South Wales. It is thought that Peter St. Albans was the first Aboriginal jockey to win the cup, on Briseis in 1876. Because St. Albans was not quite 13 years old, the jockey was too young to ride in the cup. Thus, to allow him to race Briseis in the Cup, it was argued his birthdate and parents were unknown, and from this, the legend of him being Aboriginal grew. Both these legends, however, can definitely be disproved, and history had to wait nearly another 100 years. The first jockey of Indigenous heritage to ride a Melbourne Cup winner was Frank Reys in 1973 on Gala Supreme, who had a Filipino father and a half-Aboriginal mother.

Recent years 
The race has undergone several alterations in recent years, the most visible being the entry of many foreign-trained horses. Most have failed to cope with the conditions; the three successful "foreign raids" include two by Irish trainer Dermot K. Weld successful in 1993 and 2002, and one in 2006 by Katsumi Yoshida of Japan's renowned Yoshida racing and breeding family. The attraction for foreigners to compete was, primarily, the low-profile change to the new "quality handicap" weighting system.
The 1910 Melbourne Cup was won by Comedy King, the first foreign bred horse to do so. Subsequent foreign bred horses to win Cup were Backwood 1924; Phar Lap 1930; Wotan 1936; Beldale Ball 1980; At Talaq 1986; Kingston Rule 1990; Vintage Crop 1993; Jeune 1994; Media Puzzle 2002; Makybe Diva 2003, 2004, 2005; Americain 2010 and Dunaden 2011.

The 1938 Melbourne Cup was won by trainer Mrs. Allan McDonald, who conditioned Catalogue. Mrs McDonald was a successful trainer in New Zealand, however, at the time women were not allowed to compete as trainers in Australia so her husband's name was officially recorded as the winning trainer. The 2001 edition was won by New Zealand mare Ethereal, trained by Sheila Laxon, the first woman to formally train a Melbourne Cup winner. She also won the Caulfield Cup, a 2,400-metre race also held in Melbourne, and therefore has won the "Cups Double".

Maree Lyndon became the first female to ride in the Melbourne Cup, when she partnered Argonaut Style in 1987, in which she ran second last in the 21 horse field.

In 2004, Makybe Diva became the first mare to win two cups, and also the first horse to win with different trainers, after David Hall moved to Hong Kong and transferred her to the Lee Freedman stables.

The 2005 Melbourne Cup was held before a crowd of 106,479. Makybe Diva made history by becoming the only horse to win the race three times. Trainer Lee Freedman said after the race,  "Go and find the youngest child on the course because that's the only person here who will have a chance of seeing this happen again in their lifetime."

Due to the 2007 Australian equine influenza outbreak, believed to have been started by a horse brought into Australia from Japan, neither Delta Blues nor Pop Rock participated in the 2007 Melbourne Cup. Both horses had been stabled in Japan. Corowa, NSW trained "Leica Falcon" also was not be permitted to race in Victoria, despite Corowa being close to the Victorian border. Leica Falcon was ordained as the new staying star of Australian racing in 2005 when he ran fourth in both the Caulfield Cup and in Makybe Diva's famous third Melbourne Cup victory. But serious leg injuries saw the horse not race for another 20 months. Efficient, the previous year's VRC Derby winner, won the race.

In 2013, Damien Oliver returned from an eight-month ban, after betting against his own mount at a previous race meet, to win his 3rd Melbourne cup.

The 2019 Melbourne Cup was overshadowed by recent news of the ill-treatment of horses in the Australian racing industry, and by the pulling out of celebrities including Taylor Swift, Megan Gale, and X-Men actress Lana Condor.

The Cup 
In 2016 ABC Bullion, a Pallion company, was awarded the rights to make the Melbourne Cup. The winning trophy contains 1.65 kg of 18ct Gold estimated at over $200,000. The cup is produced by W.J. Sanders a sister division within Pallion and takes over 250 hours to produce. W.j. Sanders has produced each Melbourne Cup from 2016 to present.

Timeline of notable events

1861 - The first Melbourne Cup, won by Archer, was contested by 17 runners. A horse bolted prior to the start and three horses fell during the running. Two were put down.
1862 - Archer became the first horse to win the race twice.
1863 - The smallest ever Melbourne Cup field of only seven runners contested the race after several horses were scratched in sympathy with Etienne de Mestre's champion Archer being ruled out of the race on a technicality.
1869 - The Victorian Racing Club introduced the four-day Spring Racing Carnival format.
1870 - The race was postponed a week.
1875 – The first time the race was held on the first Tuesday in November.
1876 - The youngest jockey in the history of the race Peter St. Albans won on Briseis aged 13 (officially), but actually 12 years 11 months 23 days.
1881 - Jockey John Dodd died as a result of injuries received while riding Suwarrow in the race
1882 – The first bookmakers were licensed at Flemington.
1888 – The first Gold whip was presented to the winning Cup jockey (Mick O'Brien).
1890 - The largest ever Melbourne Cup field of 39 runners contested the race with the champion Carbine (horse) winning and setting a weight carrying record of 10 st 5 lb (66 kg), which is unlikely to ever be beaten. He carried 53 lb (24 kg) more than second placed horse Highborn.
1894 – Strand starts were introduced to Flemington.
1896 – The Melbourne Cup was first filmed. This race was won by Newhaven.
1915 – First woman owner to win was Mrs E.A. Widdis with Patrobas.
1916 – The race was postponed until the following Saturday.
1925 – The first radio broadcast of the Melbourne Cup was made by the Australian Broadcasting Company.
1930 - The legendary Phar Lap won his first Melbourne Cup (after a 3rd placing the previous year), as the shortest priced favourite in history and the only favourite to win at 'odds on' (8/11).
1931 – The first year the totalisator operated at the Melbourne Cup. The Totalisator Agency Board was introduced in 1961. It was also the last of 3 Melbourne Cups that Phar Lap contested, where the handicappers allotted him 10 st 10 lb (68 kg), the heaviest weight ever carried in the race. He only managed to finish 8th behind White Nose. 
1941 - Skipton would become the final 3yo to win the race. At the time 3yo's had won more Melbourne Cups than any other age group, but changes to qualifying conditions resulted in less 3 yo's contesting the race. 
1942–44 – The Melbourne Cup was run on Saturdays during the war years.
1948 – The photo finish camera was first used in Melbourne Cup. Rimfire beat Dark Marne. However, many on-course punters believe the result should have been reversed, and it was later found that the camera was incorrectly aligned.
1958 – The first Cup start from starting stalls.
1960 – For the first time the race was televised live to Sydney.
1962 – "Fashions on the Field" was first held at the Carnival.
1971 – For the first time the race was televised live internationally, to New Zealand.
1972 - The Melbourne Cup distance was updated to the metric 3,200 metres from the previous imperial distance of 2 miles which meant the race effectively became 18.6 metres shorter. The race was won by the George Hanlon trained 40-1 outsider Piping Lane ridden by John Letts and carrying only 48 kg. 
1978 - For the first time the race was televised live in Victoria, its home state, through ATV-0
1985 – The first sponsored Melbourne Cup, and the first million dollar Cup, with $650,000 for the winner.
1987 – First female jockey to ride in the cup was Maree Lyndon on Argonaut Style.

1993 – The Dermot Weld trained Irish gelding Vintage Crop became the first Northern hemisphere trained horse to win the Melbourne Cup and the first Irish horse.  
2001 – Sheila Laxon was the first woman trainer to officially win the Melbourne Cup. However, Mrs. A. McDonald (1938) with Catalogue was really the first woman trainer to win. Women then could not be registered as trainers in Australia, and it was her husband who was the registered trainer. Mrs. McDonald's win was as a female trainer of a female owned horse.
2003 – First Australian female jockey to ride in the cup was Clare Lindop on Debben.
2003 – The first Melbourne Cup Tour was conducted around Australia, and the biggest crowd, of 122,736, is recorded at Flemington.
2005 – Makybe Diva became the only horse so far to win the Melbourne Cup three times.
2008 – The "Cup King", Bart Cummings, took his 12th win in the Melbourne Cup with Viewed
2010 – 150th anniversary. Americain becomes the first French-trained horse to win the race, and Gerald Mosse the first French jockey.
2011 - French based horse Dunaden wins from Red Cadeaux in the closest finish ever.
2012 - The first seven finishers in the race were bred in Ireland.
2013 - Trainer Gai Waterhouse became the first Australian female trainer to train the winner of the race when Fiorente won. Her father, legendary trainer Tommy J. Smith was also a Melbourne Cup Winning trainer (Toparoa in 1955 and Just A Dash in 1981). 
2014 - Two horses die due to racing in the 2014 Melbourne Cup. Cup favourite Admire Rakti, who was carrying the heaviest weight since Think Big (1975), died of heart failure in his stall after the race, and Araldo broke his leg and was euthanised after being spooked by a flag in the crowd after the race.
2015 - First woman jockey to win the cup was Michelle Payne on Prince of Penzance who became only the 4th horse to win at odds of 100–1. Red Cadeaux, the only horse to finish 2nd in the race on 3 occasions, and a public favourite, did not finish due to a fetlock injury and was euthanised 2 weeks later.
2016 - Lloyd Williams becomes the first owner to have five Melbourne Cup winners and jockey Kerrin McEvoy the jockey with the greatest timespan between his first and second Melbourne Cup winners (16 years between 2000 and 2016) as Almandin wins the cup narrowly over Heartbreak City.
2017 - Rekindling becomes the first three-year-old to win the Melbourne Cup since Skipton in 1941, however, was classed a four-year-old in the southern hemisphere.
2018 - Cross Counter, a four-year-old gelding (male) ridden by jockey Kerrin McEvoy and trained by Charlie Appleby from Great Britain wins. The CliffsofMoher was euthanised after it suffered a fractured right shoulder and couldn't be saved.
2021 - Verry Elleegant becomes the first horse in 161 runnings of the Melbourne Cup to win from barrier 18.

Public holiday
Melbourne Cup day is a public holiday for all working within metropolitan Melbourne and some parts of regional Victoria, but not for some country Victorian cities and towns which hold their own spring carnivals. For federal public servants it is also observed as a holiday in the entire state of Victoria, and from 2007 to 2009 also in the Australian Capital Territory known as Family and Community Day replacing Picnic Day. The Melbourne cup captures the public's imagination to the extent that people, whether at work, home, school, or out and about, usually stop to watch or listen to the race. Many people from outside of Melbourne take a half or full day off work to celebrate the occasion. Many people feel that the day should be a national public holiday as sick leave is said to increase on the day and productivity wanes.

As early as 1865, Cup Day was a half-holiday in Melbourne for public servants and bank officials. Various businesses also closed at lunchtime.

It took some years before the purpose of the declared holiday was acknowledged in the Victoria Government Gazette. The Gazette of 31 October 1873 announced that the following Thursday (Cup Day) be observed as a bank and civil (public) service holiday.

Results and records

Most wins by a horse
3 – Makybe Diva (2003, 2004, 2005)
2 – Think Big (1974, 1975)
2 – Rain Lover (1968, 1969)
2 – Peter Pan (1932, 1934)
2 – Archer (1861, 1862)

Most wins by a jockey
4 – Bobbie Lewis (1902, 1915, 1919, 1927)
4 – Harry White (1974, 1975, 1978, 1979)
3 – Glen Boss (2003, 2004, 2005)
3 – Jim Johnson (1963, 1968, 1969)
3 – Kerrin McEvoy (2000, 2016, 2018)
3 – William H. McLachlan (1909, 1910, 1917)
3 – Darby Munro (1934, 1944, 1946)
3 – Damien Oliver (1995, 2002, 2013)
3 – Jack Purtell (1947, 1953, 1954)

Most wins by a trainer
12 – Bart Cummings (1965, 1966, 1967, 1974, 1975, 1977, 1979, 1990, 1991, 1996, 1999, 2008)
5 – Etienne de Mestre (1861, 1862, 1867, 1877, 1878)
5 – Lee Freedman (1989, 1992, 1995, 2004, 2005)

Most wins by an owner
7 – Lloyd Williams (1981, 1985, 2007, 2012, 2016, 2017, 2020)
4 – John Tait (1866, 1868, 1871, 1872)
4 – Etienne de Mestre (1861*, 1862*, 1867*, 1878) *The winners of these years were leased.
4 – Dato Tan Chin Nam (1974, 1975, 1996, 2008)

Other records
First woman winning jockey – Michelle Payne (2015)
Record winning time – 3.16.30 Kingston Rule (1990)
Widest winning margin – 8 lengths by Archer in 1862 and Rain Lover in 1968.
Heaviest weight carried by winner – Carbine in 1890 with  Makybe Diva holds the record for a mare with 58 kg in 2005. The horse to carry the heaviest weight of all time was Phar Lap (10 stone 10 pounds, or 68 kg) in 1931 when he ran 8th.
Longest odds winners – Four horses have won at 100–1 : The Pearl (1871), Wotan (1936), Old Rowley (1940), and Prince of Penzance (2015).
Shortest odds winner – Phar Lap at 8/11 in 1930.
Favourites record – 34 of 150 favourites (23%) have won the Melbourne Cup.
Most runners – 39 (1890)
Fewest runners – 7 (1863)
Most attempts – Shadow King made six attempts to win the cup in seven years between 1929 and 1935. He ran 6th, 3rd, 2nd, 3rd, 2nd and 4th.
Oldest winner — 8yo, Toryboy in 1865, Catalogue in 1938 & Twilight Payment in 2020.

Attendance

The event is one of the most popular spectator events in Australia, with sometimes over 110,000 people, some dressed in traditional formal raceday wear and others in all manner of exotic and amusing costumes, attending the race. The record crowd was 122,736 in 2003. The 1926 running of the Cup was the first time the 100,000 mark had been passed. Today the record at Flemington is held by the 2006 Victoria Derby when almost 130,000 attended.

In 2007, a limit was placed on the Spring Carnival attendance at Flemington Racecourse and race-goers are now required to pre-purchase tickets. Every year more and more people travel to Flemington Racecourse, in 2016 there was a 7.8 per cent increase in the number of out-of-state individuals (80,472) attending the Melbourne Cup Carnival;

The popularity of the Melbourne Cup has been declining in recent years; every Melbourne Cup after 2015 since has seen a decline in attendance, with the 2019 Melbourne Cup's crowd of 81,408 the race's smallest in decades.

2021 – 10,000 (attendance restricted due to the COVID-19 pandemic)
2020 – 0 (due to the COVID-19 pandemic, general public and owners were not allowed to enter Flemington Racecourse)
2019 – 81,408 (lowest crowd on Melbourne Cup Day since 1995).
2018 – 83,471
2017 – 90,536
2016 – 97,479
2015 – 101,015
2014 – 100,794
2013 – 104,169
2012 – 106,162
2011 – 105,979
2010 – 110,223
2009 – 102,161
2008 – 107,280
2007 – 102,411
2006 – 106,691
2005 – 106,479
2004 – 98,161
2003 – 122,736 (record)
2002 – 102,533
2001 – 92,477
2000 – 121,015
1999 – 104,028
1998 – 100,607
1997 – 94,143
1996 – 90,149
1995 – 74,843
1994 – 81,650
1993 – 74,766
1992 – 86,206
1991 – 94,632
1990 – 92,536
1989 – 96,722
1988 – 93,440
1987 – 81,012
1986 – 87,129
1985 – 79,126
1984 – 82,740
1983 – 80,776
1982 – 91,152
1981 – 87,641
1980 – 101,261

Television broadcast

Off the track 

'Fashions on the Field' is a major focus of the day, with substantial prizes awarded for the best-dressed man and woman. The requirement for elegant hats, and more recently the alternative of a fascinator, almost single-handedly keeps Melbourne's milliners in business. Raceday fashion has occasionally drawn almost as much attention as the race itself, The miniskirt received worldwide publicity when model Jean Shrimpton wore a white shift version of one on Derby Day during Melbourne Cup week in 1965.

Flowers, especially roses are an important component of the week's racing at Flemington. The racecourse has around 12,000 roses within its large expanse. Over 200 varieties of the fragrant flower are nurtured by a team of up to 12 gardeners. Each of the major racedays at Flemington has an official flower. Victoria Derby Day has the Corn Flower, Melbourne Cup Day is for the Yellow Rose, Oaks Day highlights the Pink Rose and Stakes Day goes to the Red Rose.

In the Melbourne metropolitan area, the race day has been a gazetted public holiday since 1877, but around both Australia and New Zealand a majority of people watch the race on television and gamble, either through direct betting or participating in workplace cup "sweeps". In 2000, a betting agency claimed that 80 percent of the adult Australian population placed a bet on the race that year. In 2010 it was predicted that $183 million would be spent by 83,000 tourists during the Spring Racing Carnival. In New Zealand, the Melbourne Cup is the country's single biggest betting event, with carnival race-days held at several of the country's top tracks showing the cup live on big screens.

It is commonly billed as The race that stops a nation, but it is more accurately The race that stops two nations, as many people in New Zealand, as well as Australia, pause to watch the race.

"The Race That Stops The Nation" is a poem about Australia's fascination with the Melbourne Cup. Sydney born writer Vivienne McCredie wrote it in 1986. It was read out on an evening poetry radio program run by Kel Richards at the time and later published (2005 ). Copies are in the State Library of NSW and the National Library of Australia.

See also

List of Melbourne Cup placings
List of Melbourne Cup winners
Melbourne Cup Challenge / Frankie Dettori Racing video game
Melbourne Spring Racing Carnival
Thoroughbred racing in Australia

References

Further reading

External links

Official Melbourne Cup Carnival website
Melbourne Cup Prize Money
Melbourne Cup Results Since 1861
Melbourne Cup Jockey Silks footyjumpers.com
Melbourne Cup 2020
Melbourne Cup Winners
Melbourne Cup Exemption Races
Flemington on Cup Day from the National Museum of Australia
New Zealand and the Melbourne Cup (NZHistory.net.nz)
The Melbourne Cup Research Guide
Melbourne Cup Highlights
Recordings of Ken Howard calling the 1941 and 1952 Melbourne Cup were added to the National Film and Sound Archive of Australia's Sounds of Australia registry in 2011.
Early silent films of the 1896 Melbourne Cup race provided by Australian Screen Online

 
Gambling in Australia
Horse races in Australia
Public holidays in Australia
Group 1 stakes races in Australia
Open long distance horse races
Flemington Racecourse
Recurring sporting events established in 1861
1861 establishments in Australia
Articles containing video clips
November sporting events
Spring (season) events in Australia
November observances